The Dagua River (Río Dagua) is a river in Valle del Cauca. Colombia.  It generally flows north by northwest from the Farallones de Cali into the Pacific Ocean next to Buenaventura.  In recent years illegal mining has caused ecological damage to the river. The middle portion of the river runs through the Dagua Canyon Dry Enclave (Enclave Seco del Río Dagua) natural area which is listed as an Important Bird Area.

See also
 List of rivers of Colombia
 Pacific Region, Colombia
 Dagua

References

Rivers of Colombia